Hagenomyia is a genus of antlions (Myrmeleontidae) containing around 20 species occurring in Eastern Asia, tropical Africa and Australia.

Species
The species include:
 Hagenomyia angustala Bao et al., 2007
 Hagenomyia brunneipennis Esben-Petersen, 1913
 Hagenomyia posterior 
 Hagenomyia fuscithoraca 
 Hagenomyia eurysticta (Gerstaecker, 1885) 
 Hagenomyia micans (McLachlan, 1875) 
 Hagenomyia coalita 
 Hagenomyia guangxiensis Bao et al., 2007 
 Hagenomyia conjuncta 
 Hagenomyia tristis (Walker, 1853)

References

Myrmeleontidae genera
Myrmeleontinae
Insects of Asia
Taxa named by Nathan Banks